Events in the year 1993 in Turkey.

Parliament
19th Parliament of Turkey

Incumbents
President –
 Turgut Özal (up to 17 April)
Süleyman Demirel (from 16 May)
Prime Minister –
Süleyman Demirel (up to 16 May)
Erdal İnönü (acting 16 May-25 June)
Tansu Çiller (from 25 June)
Leader of the opposition – Mesut Yılmaz

Ruling party and the main opposition
 Ruling party – True Path Party (DYP)
 Main opposition – Motherland Party (ANAP)

Cabinet
49th government of Turkey (up to 25 June)
50th government of Turkey (from 25 June)

Events
11 January – 15 tonnes of narcotics were seized by the police in a Panama ensign ship
15 January – Terrorist camps were bombarded in Bingöl Province
12 January – Avalanche in Bayburt Province 
27 January – Burial service of Uğur Mumcu
21 March – Demonstrations in Nevrouz day celebration
17 April – 5 day-official mourning following the death of the president Turgut Özal 
21 April – Burial service of Turgut Özal
28 April – Methane explosion in a garbage dump; 28 deaths
16 May – Süleyman Demirel was appointed as the 9th president of Turkey. Erdal İnönü was appointed as the acting prime minister.
25 May – Terrorists killed 33 unarmed dischargees in Bingöl Province
30 May – Galatasaray won the championship of the Turkish football league
13 June  – Tansu Çiller was elected as the new president of the True Path Party. 
25 June – Tansu Çiller together with Erdal İnönü of the SHP formed the new government
 2 July – Sivas incidents: An Islamist mob sets fire to the hotel where The Satanic Verses translator Aziz Nesin resides in Sivas, killing 37 people.
12 July – Hülya Avşar wins the “best actress” award at the Moscow International Film Festival
9 August – Corruption investigation in İstanbul municipality (known as ISKİ suit)
11 September – Erdal İnönü resigned from his post in the party and Murat Karayalçın replaced him
5 October – Terrorists killed 35 civilians in Siirt Province and Batman Province
19 December – Kanal D, a satellite and cable television station, as first regular broadcasts service to start.

Births
7 January – Ozan Evrim Özenç, footballer
3 March – Ayşe Cora, female basketball player
20 March – Özge Kavurmacıoğlu , female basketball player
22 May – Berkay Candan, basketball player
18 April, Okan Derici, footballer
2 June – Melis Sezer, female tennis player
13 Temmuz – Olcay Çakır, female basketball player

Deaths

January 
 January 24 - Uğur Mumcu, investigative journalist (b. 1942)

February 
 February 5 - Adnan Kahveci, politician (b. 1949)
 February 17 - Eşref Bitlis, general of Turkish Gendarmerie (b. 1933)
 February 19 - Yaman Okay, actor (b. 1951)
 February 25 - Eren Özker, puppeteer, performed during the first season of The Muppet Show (b. 1933)

March 
 March 22 - Samiha Ayverdi, writer and Sufi  mystic (b. 1905)

April 
 April 17 - Turgut Özal, politician and 8th President of Turkey (b. 1927)

May 
 May 6 - Şükrü Balcı, high-ranking civil servant, governor and chief of police (b. 1929)
 May 9 - Fitnat Özdil, first female sport rowers in Turkey (b. 1910)
 May 26 - Ulvi Yenal, footballer (b. 1908)

June 
 June 12 - Ekrem Koçak, middle distance runner (b. 1931)

July 
  July 2 - People killed during the Sivas massacre
Muhlis Akarsu, folk singer and musician (b. 1948)
Behçet Aysan, poet (b. 1949)
Asım Bezirci, critic, writer and poet (b. 1927)
Nesimi Çimen, folk singer and poet (b. 1931)
Hasret Gültekin, musician and poet (b. 1971)
 July 7 - Rıfat Ilgaz, writer and poet (b. 1911)
 July 9 - Metin Altıok, poet (b. 1940)
 July 28 - Cemal Madanoğlu, soldier and general (b. 1907)

August  
 August 3 – Vural Arıkan, politician (born 1929)
 August 4 - Sabri Berkel, modernist painter (born 1907)

September 
 September 5 - Samim Kocagöz, novelist (b. 1916)
 September 18 - Nida Tüfekçi, folk music artist (b. 1929)

October 
 October 6 - Nejat Eczacıbaşı, chemist, industrialist, entrepreneur and philanthropist (b. 1913)
 October 13 - Tekin Arıburun, soldier and statesman (b. 1903)
 October 15 - Aydın Sayılı, historian of science (b. 1913)
 October 22 - Bahtiyar Aydın, army general (b. 1946)

November 
 November 4 - Cem Ersever, commander of Turkish Gendarmerie (b. 1950)

December 
 December 7 - Abidin Dino, painter (b. 1913)
 December 20
 Hulusi Kentmen, actor (b. 1912)
 Nazife Güran, composer (b. 1921)
 December 30 - İhsan Sabri Çağlayangil, politician and acting President of Turkey (b. 1908)

Gallery

See also
1992-93 1.Lig
Turkey in the Eurovision Song Contest 1993

References

 
Years of the 20th century in Turkey
1990s in Turkey
Turkey
Turkey
Turkey